Dorcadion axillare is a species of beetle in the family Cerambycidae. It was described by Küster in 1847. It is known from Bulgaria.

References

axillare
Beetles described in 1847